In mathematics, the phrase geometric topology may refer to:

 Geometric topology, the study of manifolds and maps between them, particularly embeddings of one manifold into another
 Geometric topology (object), a topology one can put on the set H of hyperbolic 3-manifolds of finite volume